Embryoglossa variegata is a species of snout moth in the genus Embryoglossa. It was described by Warren in 1896, and is known from northern India.

References

Moths described in 1896
Pyralinae